Albi-Madeleine station (French: Gare d'Albi-Madeleine) is a railway station in Albi, Occitanie, France. The original station opened in 1857 and the current station opened in 1899. It is on the Toulouse to Rodez railway line, and is served by Intercités de Nuit (night train) and TER (local) services.

The original station was called Albi-Midi, when it opened on 7 December 1857.

Train services
The following services currently call at Albi-Madeleine:
night services (Intercités de nuit) Paris–Orléans–Figeac–Rodez–Albi
local service (TER Occitanie) Toulouse–Albi–Rodez

References

Railway stations in Tarn (department)
Railway stations in France opened in 1857